Harts Range is a town in the Northern Territory of Australia located on the Plenty Highway  by road northeast of Alice Springs.

Most of its population are of Aboriginal descent, residing in the nearby community of Atitjere. Since 1947, each year an annual racing meet has been held at the Harts Range Racecourse on the Picnic Day long weekend. The event has grown to include rodeo, novelty, and family events in a three-day festival known as the "Harts Range Bush Sports Weekend". A police station at Harts Range services the surrounding district, comprising remote cattle stations and Aboriginal communities. A transmitter for the Jindalee Operational Radar Network is located near Harts Range. The area was shortlisted as a potential site for a low-level and intermediate-level radioactive waste storage and disposal facility, raising concerns that the local hydrogeology could result in spills contaminating the ground water.

References

Towns in the Northern Territory